Horst Mandl (January 8, 1936 – July 14, 2018) was an Austrian athlete.  He was born in Graz, Steiermark, Austria.  He represented Austria in the decathlon at the 1968 Olympics.  While he was not able to complete the first day at the Olympics, he was the Austrian National Champion in 110 metres hurdles (1967-1969), high jump (1970 and 1973), long jump (1962, 1964-1966), triple jump 9 times in row (1964-1972), pentathlon (1967-1968) and decathlon (1963-1965 and 1969-1971).

He also took up coaching, among his first success stories was future wife Doris, who he coached to the state championship in the 100 metres hurdles.  He coached at the General Gymnastics Club Graz until his retirement.

He continued competing into masters age groups, winning the world championships in the M40 110 hurdles, high jump and triple jump in 1977 and the M50 high jump and triple jump in 1987.  In 1976 he set the masters M40 world record in the high jump at 2.02m which lasted for 5 years until it was surpassed by John Dobroth.  In 1996 he again set a masters M60 world record at 1.70, improving on the record of Milton Newton, which would hold for two years until it was surpassed by Phil Fehlen.  Since 2001, he is tied with Jim Gilcrest for the current M65 Indoor record at 1.62.

References

1936 births
2018 deaths
Austrian decathletes
Austrian male high jumpers
Austrian male long jumpers
Austrian male triple jumpers
Austrian male hurdlers
Athletes (track and field) at the 1968 Summer Olympics
Olympic athletes of Austria
Sportspeople from Graz